The Preto River (: Black River) is a river in the state of Minas Gerais, Brazil. It is a tributary of the Araçuaí River.

The Rio Preto was declared a "permanently protected river" in 1991 in response to demand from the local community.

See also
List of rivers of Minas Gerais

References

Rivers of Minas Gerais